The Paxman Valenta was an engine made by Paxman, Colchester for the High Speed Train, and is still in use in various marine applications, such as the Upholder/Victoria-class submarines, additionally 4 Paxman Valenta engines provide the electrical power to propel and operate the Royal Navy’s Type 23 Frigates.

History

The Paxman Valenta was developed in the early 1970s for British Rail with the aim of using in both freight and passenger locomotives. However the engine was only used in the two pre-production Class 41 and 197 production Class 43 powercars that were delivered to power High Speed Trains between 1975 and 1982.

The engine as originally fitted to the HSTs was designated 12RP200L and was a V12 four-stroke turbo-charged & intercooled diesel unit of 79 litres which developed 2,250 bhp at 1,500 rpm. The design of the Valenta was based on the Ventura which was fitted to the Class 29 diesel locomotives, amongst others. The engine is famous for the "Valenta Scream" on starting from rest, a distinctive high-pitched whine caused by the engine's turbocharger. In 1977, the Valenta received the Queen's Awards for Enterprise.

In 1985, four powercars (43167-43170) were fitted with Mirrlees MB190 engines. Beginning in 1995, a small number were fitted with Paxman VP185 engines, however the majority retained Valentas.

In May 2005, First Great Western had Brush Traction fit two with MTU 16V4000 engines. Judged a success, as part of a project to extend the lives of the HSTs, First Great Western decided to repower its entire fleet. GNER, CrossCountry, Network Rail and Grand Central also decided to repower their fleets with MTUs. The only operator not to was East Midlands Trains, which opted to replace its Valentas with Paxman VP185s.

Grand Central's 43084 and 43123 were the last two Valenta-engined powercars in service. They were taken out of traffic on 22 December 2010 for repowering with the latter named Valenta 1972-2010.

Restoration
In May 2011, it was announced that the 125 Group would return prototype HST powercar 41001 to service. The powercar was at that time on static display at the National Railway Museum, York. It received a full overhaul, and was fitted with a reconditioned Paxman Valenta RP200L engine, number S508 installed new into Virgin CrossCountry's 43153 in 2001, before re-installation into First Great Western's 43143 after a spell in storage. It was one of about 10 engines that the 125 Group obtained.

On 15 November 2014, 41001 hauled its first passenger train in preservation.

Australian XPT
The engine was also fitted to the State Rail Authority's XPT, which was based on the HST power car design. Fourteen power car units were built in the 1980s by Commonwealth Engineering, Sydney followed by four by ABB Transportation, Melbourne in 1994. All were re-powered with VP185s in the early 2000s.

References

Diesel engines by model
Diesel locomotive engines
Valenta
V12 engines